Sony Xperia Z series is a line of flagship Android smartphones and tablets in the Sony Xperia series manufactured by Sony Mobile.

On February 25, 2016, Sony discontinued the Xperia Z series in favor of the Sony Xperia X series, but the device serving as the true successor of the Z5 is the Xperia XZ, Sony's flagship after the Xperia Z5 Premium.

Models

Smartphones

Xperia Z

At the CES 2013 in Las Vegas, Sony announced the original Xperia Z. It is a smartphone with a 5-inch FHD screen size, 2GB of RAM, Quad Core processor and water and dust resistance, because of the last, many companies started to make phones with water and dust resistance including Samsung with the Samsung Galaxy S4 Active and their later model - the Samsung Galaxy S5. The Xperia Z won the ‘Best Smartphone' and ‘Best of Show' awards At CES 2013. According to a Sony executive, Mcdougall, early Xperia Z sales have been strong. He states, "It (the Xperia smartphone) sold over 150,000 units in its first week in Japan, taking a 24 percent market share straight away." "It may be a bit too early to say but the first signs are very positive."

Xperia ZR

First announced at CES 2013, Xperia ZR is a mid range smartphone with a 4.55 inch screen, 2GB of RAM, Quad core processor. The smartphone also has Ingress Protection Ratings of IP55 and IP58, making it dust protected, low pressure water jet protected, and waterproof. It was released on 17 May 2013 in Japan where it is marketed as the 'Xperia A'.

Xperia ZL

The Xperia ZL is a slightly changed variant of the Sony Xperia Z. The ZL compromises water and dust proofing for a thinner frame, an IR blaster, a dedicated camera button, slightly more battery capacity and a cheaper build.

Xperia Z1/Z1s

First announced at IFA 2013 in Berlin, the Sony Xperia Z1 is a high-end Android smartphone produced by Sony Mobile Communications AB. The Xperia Z1 is a dust resistance and waterproof phone with a rating of IP55 and 58. The main feature of the device is the 20.7 megapixels camera, paired with Sony's in-house G lens and its image processing algorithm called, BIONZ. Similar to its predecessor, the Sony Xperia Z, the phone features tempered glass covered by shatterproof film on front and back which is held together by a one piece aluminium frame. With Qualcomm's latest quad-core Snapdragon S800 processor clocked at 2.2Ghz and 2GB of RAM, it also contains a 5.0 inch Sony's Triluminos and its X-Reality Engine for better image and video viewing.  Sony announced the Sony Xperia Z1s at CES 2014, a modified version of the Sony Xperia Z1 exclusive to T-Mobile US, was released in the United States.

Xperia Z1 Compact

First announced at CES 2014, the Xperia Z1 Compact is a smaller version of the 5-incher Xperia Z1 with a 4.3 inch HD 720p display. It does retain the same hardware as the Xperia Z1, such as the 20.7MP camera.

Xperia Z2

First announced at MWC 2014, the Xperia Z2 continues the Xperia Z series with the latest Snapdragon 801 and enabled 4K video recording. It comes with latest Android Version (5.1.1 lollipop) with an optimized Xperia UI. Xperia Z2 has the same 20.7MP camera as Z1 and Z1 Compact. It has a much improved display now -Sony used IPS technology instead of TFT, which means that there is a very noticeable improvement in viewing angles and color accuracy.

Xperia Z3

The Xperia Z3 was announced at the IFA 2014 in Berlin. As its predecessor, it will feature Snapdragon 801 and 4K video recording. The device has Remote Play, allowing users to play PlayStation 4 games. Unlike the Xperia Z2, it weighs 152g and has microSD support up to 128 GB – a 32 GB version is also available, with a new IP rating, IP65 and 68. The Xperia Z3 was released in September 2014.

The Xperia Z3 Dual, also known as Xperia Z3 D6633 has dual-SIM support.

Xperia Z3 Compact

Also announced at the IFA 2014 in Berlin, it comes with the same processor as the Xperia Z3. Unlike the Z1 Compact, its weight is 129g and has a 4.6" display. Its RAM has been reduced to 2GB from the 3GB of the Xperia Z3. Like its flagship, it has the same IP rating and was released in September 2014.

Xperia Z3+ (Z4 in Japan)

Xperia Z5

Xperia Z5 Compact

Xperia Z5 Premium

Phablets

Xperia Z Ultra

The Sony Xperia Z Ultra is the first phablet manufactured by Sony. The Xperia Z Ultra can be used to take notes or draw on with a regular pen or pencil. With a display of 6.44 inches, it has Sony's TRILUMINOS™ and X-Reality for mobile technology, with an OptiContrast panel to reduce reflection and enable clearer viewing even in bright sun lighting.

Tablets

Xperia Tablet Z

The Sony Xperia Tablet Z is a 10.1-inch tablet manufactured by Sony. First announced in Japan, the tablet was then announced globally in Barcelona at the Mobile World Congress on February 25, 2013. Weighing 1.09 pounds (495 grams) and just 0.27 inches (6.9 mm) thick, it is the thinnest and lightest 10-inch tablet in the world. Succeeding the Xperia Tablet S, the Xperia Tablet Z comes with a faster processor, a better front-facing camera, a higher-resolution screen, and Ingress Protection Ratings of IP55 and IP57, for dust-protected, water-jet protected, and waterproof in up to one meter of water for up to thirty minutes. The tablet was released in May 2013.

Xperia Z2 Tablet

The Sony Xperia Z2 Tablet was announced on February 24, 2014, as a successor to the Sony Xperia Tablet Z, featuring the same waterproof capabilities. It was the first tablet to run the 2.3 GHz Qualcomm Snapdragon 801 processor. Sony stated at the time of the unveiling that this tablet was the thinnest and lightest 10-inch tablet in the world. The release date was set to March 2014.

Xperia Z3 Tablet Compact

The Sony Xperia Z3 Compact Tablet was announced in September 2014. It comes with a 2.5 GHz Qualcomm Snapdragon 801 processor, as well as an 8.0" display. The tablet was scheduled to be released in October 2014.

Xperia Z4 Tablet

The Sony Xperia Z4 Tablet was announced on 2 March 2015. It comes with a 2 K resolution 10.0-inch screen and it is powered by Qualcomm Snapdragon 810 processor. The tablet was expected to be released in June 2015.

Comparison
This table is primarily intended to show the differences between the model families of the Xperia Z series. The list only covers unlocked and international devices.

Phones

Phablets

Tablets

See also
Sony Xperia

Notes

References

Z
Android (operating system) devices
Line of flagship smartphones